Élmer Ángel Acevedo Aguilar (27 January 1949 – 30 August 2017) was a footballer from El Salvador.

Club career
Born in La Libertad Department, he moved to study in Santa Ana and joined the youth team of local club FAS, aged 16.

After six years in the first team, Acevedo retired in 1972 due to a serious injury to his left leg.

International career
Acevedo represented El Salvador at the 1968 Olympic Games and in 1970 FIFA World Cup qualification, where he scored in 1 match against Honduras which sparked the infamous Football War. He also was a non-playing member of their 1970 World Cup Finals squad in Mexico.

He died on 30 August 2017, in Acajutla, Sonsonate, El Salvador.

References

1949 births
2017 deaths
People from La Libertad Department (El Salvador)
Association football forwards
Salvadoran footballers
El Salvador international footballers
Olympic footballers of El Salvador
Footballers at the 1968 Summer Olympics
1970 FIFA World Cup players
C.D. FAS footballers